László Beleznai (November 16, 1891 in Budapest – March 23, 1953 in Budapest) was a Hungarian water polo player and freestyle swimmer who competed in the 1912 Summer Olympics. He was a member of the Hungarian water polo team, which competed in the 1912 tournament.

Also he was a member of the Hungarian 4x200 metre freestyle relay team, which qualified for the final, but did not compete. In the 100 metre freestyle event he qualified for the quarterfinals, but did also not compete.

References

External links
profile 

1891 births
1953 deaths
Hungarian male water polo players
Hungarian male freestyle swimmers
Hungarian male swimmers
Water polo players at the 1912 Summer Olympics
Swimmers at the 1912 Summer Olympics
Olympic water polo players of Hungary
Olympic swimmers of Hungary
Swimmers from Budapest